Vengeance of Rannah is a 1936 American Western film directed by Bernard B. Ray, produced by Ray and Harry S. Webb for Reliable Pictures, and starring Bob Custer and Rin Tin Tin, Jr.

Plot
Insurance investigator Ted Sanders is assigned to look into a robbery/murder. When he arrives at the crime scene he is met by a local deputy. What he doesn't know, however, is that the "deputy" is actually part of the gang that committed the crime. He plants some of the stolen money in Sanders' room to frame him for the crime, then arrests him.

Cast 
Rin Tin Tin, Jr. as Rannah
Bob Custer as Ted Sanders
John Elliott as Doc Adams
Victoria Vinton as Mary Warner
Roger Williams as Frank Norcross
Oscar Gahan as Henchman Nolan
Eddie Phillips as Henchman Macklin
Ed Cassidy as Sam, posing as Barlow
Wally West as Deputy Barlow

External links 

1936 films
1936 Western (genre) films
American black-and-white films
American Western (genre) films
Reliable Pictures films
Films directed by Bernard B. Ray
Rin Tin Tin
1930s English-language films
1930s American films